Gary Donnelly and Gary Muller were the defending champions, but did not participate this year.

Alexander Mronz and Greg Van Emburgh won the title, defeating Paul Annacone and Patrick McEnroe 6–3, 6–7, 7–5 in the final.

Seeds

  Paul Annacone /  Patrick McEnroe (final)
  Paul Chamberlin /  Larry Scott (quarterfinals)
  Jon Levine /  Tony Mmoh (first round)
  Mark Basham /  Charles Beckman (semifinals)

Draw

Draw

References
Draw

Men's Doubles